Łojowice may refer to the following places in Poland:
Łojowice, Lower Silesian Voivodeship (south-west Poland)
Łojowice, Świętokrzyskie Voivodeship (south-central Poland)